Yevhen Bulyi (born 18 July 1995) is a Ukrainian professional football defender who played for FC Costuleni in the Moldovan National Division.

Bulyi is product of youth team systems of FC Chornomorets. From August 2014 he played for FC Costuleni.

References

External links
Profile at FFU Official Site (Ukr)

1995 births
Living people
Ukrainian footballers
FC Chornomorets Odesa players
Ukrainian expatriate footballers
Expatriate footballers in Moldova
FC Costuleni players
Association football defenders